Jocara bryoxantha is a species of snout moth in the genus Jocara. It is found in Bolivia.

References

Moths described in 1936
Jocara